The Trouper is a 1922 American silent comedy-drama film directed by Harry B. Harris and starring Gladys Walton, Jack Perrin, Thomas Holding, Kathleen O'Connor, Roscoe Karns, and Mary Philbin. The film was released by Universal Film Manufacturing Company on July 23, 1922.

Cast

Preservation
With no prints of The Trouper located in any film archives, it is a lost film.

References

External links

1922 comedy-drama films
1920s English-language films
1922 films
American silent feature films
American black-and-white films
Universal Pictures films
Lost American films
1922 lost films
1920s American films
Lost comedy-drama films
Silent American comedy-drama films